The ICC Men's Cricket World Cup League 2 is an international cricket competition contested in the One Day International format and the second level of the three-league Cricket World Cup qualification system which was introduced in 2019. Seven teams participate and either directly advance to the World Cup Qualifier or advance to the World Cup Qualifier Play-off for another chance to enter the Qualifier. Two teams from the Qualifier qualify for the next Cricket World Cup. League 2 and the Qualifier Play-off replaced the ICC World Cricket League Championship and ICC World Cricket League Division Two for determining World Cup qualification. The first edition was in 2019–2023.

Editions

References

External links
Official website

League 2
Qualification for cricket competitions